Sheykh Saleh Qandi (also Romanized as Sheykh Şāleḩ Qandī) is a village in Abu Ghoveyr Rural District, Musian District, Dehloran County, Ilam Province, Iran. At the 2006 census, its population was 518, in 98 families. The village is populated by Arabs.

References 

Populated places in Dehloran County
Arab settlements in llam Province